Janatella is a genus of butterflies which range from Central to South America in the family Nymphalidae. The species Janatella has trapezoidal wings that allow them to fly easily and fast. The flying performance of butterflies enabled the recreation of them into efficient aircraft using similar dimensions to that of butterfly wings.

Species
Listed alphabetically:
Janatella fellula (Schaus, 1902) (Ecuador, Colombia)
Janatella hera (Cramer, [1779]) (French Guiana, Surinam)
Janatella leucodesma (C. & R. Felder, 1861) (Trinidad, St. Vincent, Panama, Nicaragua, Colombia, Venezuela)

References

Melitaeini
Nymphalidae of South America
Butterfly genera
Taxa named by Robert P. Higgins